The 2009–10 network television schedule for the five major English-language commercial broadcast networks in the United States. The schedule covers primetime hours from September 2009 through August 2010. The schedule is followed by a list per network of returning series, new series, and series canceled after the 2008–09 season.

Fox was the first to announce its fall schedule on May 18, 2009, followed by ABC and NBC on May 19, CBS on May 20, and The CW on May 21, 2009.

PBS is not included; member stations have local flexibility over most of their schedules and broadcasts times for network shows may vary. NBC stripped The Jay Leno Show weeknights at 10 p.m. Eastern/9 p.m. Central, but removed it after the 2010 Vancouver Winter Olympics. The CW eliminated its Sunday night programming block and returned that time to local affiliates; it returned to programming Sunday nights in the 2018-19 season. After three years as a network, MyNetworkTV became a programming service, and therefore not recognized as a network.

New series are highlighted in bold.

All times are U.S. Eastern Time and Pacific Time (except for some live sports or events). Subtract for one hour for Central, Mountain, Alaska and Hawaii-Aleutian times.

Note: From February 12 to February 28, 2010, all NBC primetime programming was pre-empted for coverage of 2010 Winter Olympics in Vancouver.

Each of the 30 highest-rated shows is listed with its rank and rating as determined by Nielsen Media Research.

Legend

Sunday

Monday

Tuesday

Wednesday

NOTES: On NBC, Parenthood was supposed to have started the night at 8–9, but it was delayed to midseason at the last minute and placed Mercy instead. On Fox, Our Little Genius was supposed to debut on January 10, 2010 but was cancelled and replaced with American Idol.

Thursday

Friday

NOTE: On NBC, Southland would have to be aired 9–10, but it was cancelled at the last minute and it was picked up by TNT.

Saturday

By network

ABC

Returning series:
20/20
ABC Saturday Movie of the Week
America's Funniest Home Videos
The Bachelor
The Bachelorette
Better Off Ted
Brothers & Sisters
Castle
Dancing with the Stars
Dating in the Dark
Desperate Housewives
Extreme Makeover: Home Edition
Grey's Anatomy
Lost
Primetime
Primetime: What Would You Do?
Private Practice
Saturday Night Football
Scrubs
Shaq Vs.
Shark Tank
Supernanny
True Beauty
Ugly Betty
Wipeout
Wife Swap

New series:
Bachelor Pad *
Cougar Town
The Deep End *
Downfall *
Eastwick
Find My Family
FlashForward
The Forgotten
The Gates *
Hank
Happy Town *
Jamie Oliver's Food Revolution *
The Middle
Modern Family
Romantically Challenged *
Rookie Blue *
Scoundrels *
V

Not returning from 2008–09:
According to Jim
Boston Legal
Crash Course
Cupid
Dirty Sexy Money
Eli Stone
The Goode Family
Homeland Security USA
In the Motherhood
I Survived a Japanese Game Show
Life on Mars
Opportunity Knocks
Pushing Daisies
Samantha Who?
The Superstars
Surviving Suburbia
The Unusuals
The Wonderful World of Disney (returned for 2019–20)

CBS

Returning series:
48 Hours
60 Minutes
The Amazing Race
The Big Bang Theory
Cold Case
Criminal Minds
CSI: Crime Scene Investigation
CSI: Miami
CSI: NY
Flashpoint
Gary Unmarried
Ghost Whisperer
How I Met Your Mother
Medium (moved from NBC)
The Mentalist
NCIS
The New Adventures of Old Christine
Numb3rs
Rules of Engagement
Survivor
Two and a Half Men

New series:
Accidentally on Purpose
Arranged Marriage
The Bridge *
The Good Wife
Miami Medical *
NCIS: Los Angeles
Three Rivers
Undercover Boss *

Not returning from 2008–09:
Eleventh Hour
The Ex List
Game Show in My Head
Harper's Island
Million Dollar Password
The Unit
Without a Trace
Worst Week

The CW

Returning series:
90210
America's Next Top Model
Gossip Girl
Moonlight (only reruns, previously on CBS)
One Tree Hill
Smallville
Supernatural

New series:
18 to Life *
The Beautiful Life: TBL
Blonde Charity Mafia (Canceled before airing any episodes)
Fly Girls *
High Society *
Life Unexpected *
Melrose Place
Plain Jane *
The Vampire Diaries

Not returning from 2008–09:
13: Fear Is Real
4Real
The CW Sunday Night Movie
Easy Money
Everybody Hates Chris
The Game (moved to BET in 2010)
In Harm's Way
Privileged
Reaper
Stylista
Valentine

Fox

Returning series:
24
America's Most Wanted
American Dad!
American Idol
Bones
COPS
Dollhouse
Family Guy
Fringe
Hell's Kitchen
House
Kitchen Nightmares
Lie to Me
NFL on Fox
The OT
The Simpsons
So You Think You Can Dance
'Til Death

New series:
Brothers
The Cleveland Show
Glee
The Good Guys *
Human Target *
MasterChef *
Past Life *
Sons of Tucson *

Not returning from 2008–09:
Are You Smarter than a 5th Grader? (returned for 2014–15)
Do Not Disturb
Don't Forget the Lyrics! (revived for 2021–22)
Hole in the Wall (moved to Cartoon Network)
King of the Hill (moved to syndication in 2010)
Mental
The Moment of Truth
More to Love
Osbournes Reloaded
Prison Break (returned for 2016–17)
Secret Millionaire (moved to ABC in 2010–11)
Sit Down, Shut Up
Terminator: The Sarah Connor Chronicles

MyNetworkTV

Returning series:
Are You Smarter than a 5th Grader? (first run syndication)
Magic's Biggest Secrets Revealed (repeats, airs in place of movies some weeks)
Deal or No Deal (first run syndication)
Law & Order: Criminal Intent (syndicated repeats)
My Thursday Night Movie (feature film repeats)
The Unit (syndicated repeats)
WWE SmackDown

New series:
None, due to MyNetworkTV's decision to air syndicated programming only

Not returning from 2008–09:
Celebrity Exposé
Comics Unleashed
Jail
Masters of Illusion
My Saturday Night Movie
Street Patrol
The Tony Rock Project
The Twilight Zone
Under One Roof
Vice Squad
Whacked Out Videos
World's Funniest Moments

NBC

Returning series:
30 Rock
America's Got Talent
The Apprentice
The Biggest Loser
Chuck
Football Night in America
Heroes
Last Comic Standing
Law & Order
Law & Order: Special Victims Unit
NBC Sunday Night Football
The Office
Parks and Recreation
Saturday Night Live Weekend Update Thursday

 
New series:
100 Questions *
Community
The Jay Leno Show
Losing It with Jillian *
The Marriage Ref *
Mercy
Minute to Win It *
Parenthood *
Persons Unknown *
The Sing-Off
Trauma
Who Do You Think You Are? *

 
Not returning from 2008–09:
America's Toughest Jobs
The Chopping Block
Crusoe
Deal or No Deal (revived by CNBC in 2018)
ER
The Great American Road Trip
Howie Do It
I'm a Celebrity...Get Me Out of Here!
Kath & Kim
Kings
Knight Rider
Life
Lipstick Jungle
The Listener (moved to Ion Television in 2012–13)
Medium (moved to CBS)
Merlin (moved to Syfy)
Momma's Boys
My Name Is Earl
My Own Worst Enemy
The Philanthropist
Southland (moved to TNT)
Superstars of Dance

Renewals and cancellations

Full season pickups
ABC
 Castle – picked up for a full 22-episode season on October 20, 2009. An additional 2 episodes were ordered for a 24-episode season on January 27, 2010.
 Cougar Town – picked up for a full 22-episode season on October 8, 2009. An additional 2 episodes were ordered for a 24-episode season on January 6, 2010.
 FlashForward – picked up for a full 22-episode season on October 12, 2009. 3 additional episodes ordered later the same day for a 25-episode season.
 The Forgotten – picked up for 5 additional episodes for an 18-episode season on November 10, 2009.
 The Middle – picked up for a full 22-episode season on October 8, 2009.
 Modern Family – picked up for a full 22-episode season on October 8, 2009.

CBS
 Accidentally on Purpose – picked up for 5 additional episodes for an 18-episode season on November 3, 2009. Cancelled.
 The Good Wife – picked up for a full 22-episode season on October 7, 2009. One additional episode was later ordered for a 23-episode season.
 NCIS: Los Angeles – picked up for a full 22-episode season on October 7, 2009. An additional 2 episodes were picked up, making a 24-episode season on November 4, 2009.

The CW
 Melrose Place- The CW ordered 6 additional scripts on September 24, 2009. Five of these were then picked up for an 18-episode season on October 21, 2009.
 One Tree Hill – picked up for a full 22-episode season on September 24, 2009.
 The Vampire Diaries – The CW ordered 9 additional scripts on September 24, 2009. Picked up for a full 22-episode season on October 21, 2009.

Fox
 The Cleveland Show – picked up for a full 22-episode first season on November 10, 2008.
 Glee – picked up for a full 22-episode season on September 21, 2009.
 Lie to Me – picked up for a full 22-episode season on November 24, 2009

NBC
 Chuck – picked up for an additional 6 episodes, bringing the total to 19, on October 28, 2009.
 Community – picked up for a full 22-episode season on October 23, 2009. An additional 3 episodes were ordered January 20, 2010 for a 25-episode season.
 Law & Order – picked up for an additional 3 episodes on January 20, 2010, for a 22-episode season.
 Law & Order: Special Victims Unit – picked up for an additional 2 episodes on January 20, 2010, for a 25-episode season.
 Mercy – picked up for a full 22-episode season on October 23, 2009.
 Parks and Recreation – picked up for a full 22-episode season on October 23, 2009. An additional 3 episodes were ordered January 20, 2010 for a 25-episode season.
 Trauma – picked up for an additional 3 episodes, bringing the total to 16, on November 19, 2009. An additional 4 episodes were ordered January 20, 2010 for a 20-episode season.

Renewals
ABC
 Brothers & Sisters – Renewed for a fifth season on March 5, 2010.
 Castle – Renewed for a third season on March 30, 2010.
 Cougar Town – Renewed for a second season on January 12, 2010.
 Desperate Housewives – Renewed for a seventh season on May 14, 2010.
 Grey's Anatomy – Renewed for a seventh season on May 14, 2010.
 The Middle – Renewed for a second season on January 12, 2010.
 Modern Family – Renewed for a second season on January 12, 2010.
 Private Practice – Renewed for a fourth season on May 14, 2010.
 Rookie Blue – Renewed for a second season on July 12, 2010.
 V – Renewed for a second season on May 13, 2010.

CBS
 The Amazing Race – Renewed for a seventeenth season on January 25, 2010.
 The Big Bang Theory – Renewed for two additional seasons in March 2009, running through its fourth season in 2010/11.
 The Good Wife – Renewed for a second season on January 14, 2010.
How I Met Your Mother- Renewed for a sixth season on January 25, 2010.
 The Mentalist – Renewed for a third season on May 19, 2010.
 NCIS – Renewed for an eighth season on May 19, 2010.
 NCIS: Los Angeles – Renewed for a second season on January 14, 2010.
 Rules of Engagement – Renewed for a fifth season on May 18, 2010.
 Survivor – Renewed for two additional installments on January 25, 2010.
 Two and a Half Men – Renewed for three additional seasons in March 2009, running through its ninth season in 2011/12.
 Undercover Boss – Renewed for a second season on March 9, 2010.

The CW
 90210 – Renewed for a third season on February 16, 2010.
 America's Next Top Model – Renewed on February 16, 2010.
 Gossip Girl – Renewed for a fourth season on February 16, 2010.
 Life Unexpected – Renewed for a second season on May 18, 2010.
 One Tree Hill – Renewed for an eighth season on May 18, 2010.
 Smallville – Renewed for a tenth and final season on March 4, 2010.
 Supernatural – Renewed for a sixth season on February 16, 2010.
 The Vampire Diaries – Renewed for a second season on February 16, 2010.

Fox
 American Dad! – Renewed for an additional season in October 2009, running through its sixth season in 2010/11.
 Bones – Renewed for two additional seasons in May 2009, running through its sixth season in 2010/11.
 The Cleveland Show – Renewed for an additional season in October 2009, running through its second season in 2010/11.
 Family Guy  – Renewed for a ninth season (airing 2010/11) prior to the 2009/10 season premiere.
 Fringe – Renewed for a third season on March 6, 2010.
 Glee – Renewed for a second season on January 11, 2010.
 House – Renewed for a seventh season on May 17, 2010.
 Human Target – Renewed for a second season on May 12, 2010.
 Lie to Me – Renewed for a third season on May 12, 2010.
 The Simpsons – Renewed for two additional seasons in February 2009, running through its twenty-second season in 2010/11.

NBC
 30 Rock – Renewed for a fifth season on March 5, 2010.
 The Apprentice – Renewed for a tenth season on March 17, 2010.
 Chuck – Renewed for a fourth season on May 13, 2010.
 Community – Renewed for a second season on March 5, 2010.
 Law & Order: Special Victims Unit – Renewed for a twelfth season on May 14, 2010.
 The Marriage Ref – Renewed for a second season on April 5, 2010.
 Minute to Win It – Renewed for a second season on April 5, 2010.
 The Office – Renewed for a seventh season on March 5, 2010.
 Parenthood – Renewed for a second season on April 20, 2010.
 Parks and Recreation – Renewed for a third season on January 29, 2010
 The Sing-Off – Renewed for a second season on February 28, 2010.
 Who Do You Think You Are? – Renewed for a second season on April 5, 2010.

Cancellations/Series endings

ABC
 Better Off Ted – Canceled on May 13, 2010, after two seasons. ABC announced it would air the final two episodes in June 2010 if the 2010 NBA Finals did not require a seventh game, however a seventh game was played and the two episodes did not air on ABC.
 The Deep End – Canceled on May 14, 2010.
 Defying Gravity – Canceled due to low ratings during the summer.
 Eastwick – Canceled on November 9, 2009.
 FlashForward – Canceled on May 13, 2010.
 The Forgotten – Canceled on May 18, 2010.
 Hank – Canceled on November 11, 2009.
 Happy Town – Canceled on May 18, 2010.
 Lost – It was announced on January 19, 2010, that season six would be the final season. The series concluded on May 23, 2010.
 Romantically Challenged – Canceled on May 13, 2010.
 Scrubs – Canceled on May 13, 2010, after nine seasons. The series concluded on March 17, 2010
 True Beauty – It was canceled with the last episode airing on July 19, 2010.
 Ugly Betty – Canceled on April 14, 2010, after four seasons.

CBS
 Accidentally On Purpose – Canceled on May 18, 2010.
 Cold Case – Canceled on May 18, 2010, after seven seasons.
 Gary Unmarried – Canceled on May 18, 2010, after two seasons.
 Ghost Whisperer – Canceled on May 18, 2010, after five seasons.
 Miami Medical – Canceled on May 18, 2010.
 The New Adventures of Old Christine – Canceled on May 18, 2010, after five seasons.
 Numb3rs – Canceled on May 18, 2010, after six seasons.
 Three Rivers – Canceled on January 9, 2010.

The CW
 The Beautiful Life: TBL – Canceled on September 25, 2009, after two low rated episodes. This is the first cancellation of the 2009–10 season. The remaining episodes aired on YouTube in December 2009.
 Blonde Charity Mafia – Canceled on May 20, 2010.
 Fly Girls – Canceled on May 20, 2010.
 High Society – Canceled on May 20, 2010.
 Hitched or Ditched – Canceled on May 20, 2010.
 Melrose Place – Canceled on May 20, 2010.

Fox
 24 – It was announced on March 26, 2010, that season eight would be the final season. The series concluded on May 24, 2010. On May 13, 2013, it was announced that the series would return as a limited series, titled 24: Live Another Day in May 2014.
 Brothers – Canceled on March 29, 2010.
 Dollhouse – Canceled on November 11, 2009.
 Past Life – Canceled after three episodes on February 19, 2010, due to low ratings.
 Sons of Tucson – Canceled after four episodes on April 5, 2010, due to low ratings.
 'Til Death – Brad Garrett confirmed the show's cancellation on March 23, 2010.

MyNetworkTV
WWE SmackDown – Moved to Syfy in October 2010. The move leaves MyNetworkTV with no original programming.

NBC
 Heroes – Canceled on May 14, 2010, after four seasons. It was returned as miniseries titled Heroes: Reborn in 2015.
 The Jay Leno Show – Canceled on January 7, 2010. See the 2010 Tonight Show conflict.
 Law & Order – Canceled on May 13, 2010, after twenty seasons (tying it with Gunsmoke as the longest-running primetime drama). The series concluded on May 24, 2010. On September 28, 2021, it was announced that the series would return for a twenty-first season.
 Mercy – Canceled on May 14, 2010.
 The Philanthropist – Canceled on October 21, 2009.
 Southland – Canceled on October 8, 2009. The series moved to TNT in January 2010.
 Trauma – Canceled on May 14, 2010.

Top weekly ratings 
 Data sources: AC Nielsen, TV By The Numbers

Total viewers

18–49 viewers

See also 
2009–10 United States network television schedule (daytime)
2009–10 United States network television schedule (late night)

References 

United States primetime network television schedules
2009 in American television
2010 in American television